Keytikh (also, Keymikh, Keytakh, Kochevka Kaytakh, Kochevka Keytakh, and Kyurdemich) is a village in the Absheron Rayon of Azerbaijan.

References 

Populated places in Absheron District